The 2014 Acropolis Rally was the third round of the 2014 European Rally Championship season, held in Greece between 28–30 March 2014.

The rally was won by Craig Breen and co-driver Scott Martin, on the competitive début of Peugeot's 208 T16 R5 rally car.

Results

References

Acropolis
Acropolis Rally
Acropolis